Hickory is a common name for trees composing the genus Carya, which includes around 18 species. Five or six species are native to China, Indochina, and India (Assam), as many as twelve are native to the United States, four are found in Mexico, and two to four are native to Canada. A number of hickory species are used for products like edible nuts or wood.

Hickories are temperate forest trees with pinnately compound leaves and large nuts. Hickory flowers are small, yellow-green catkins produced in spring. They are wind-pollinated and self-incompatible. The nut shell is thick and bony in most species, and thin in a few, notably the pecan (C. illinoinensis); it is divided into two halves, which split apart when the seed germinates.

Etymology
The name "hickory" derives from a Native American word in an Algonquian language (perhaps Powhatan). It is a shortening of pockerchicory, pocohicora, or a similar word, which may be the name for the hickory tree's nut, or may be a milky drink made from such nuts.

Species and classification
The genus Carya is in the walnut family, Juglandaceae. In the APG system, this family is included in the order Fagales. Several species are known to hybridize, with around nine accepted, named hybrids. Beaked hickory (Annamocarya sinensis) is a species formerly classified as Carya sinensis, but now considered its own genus, Annamocarya.

Asian hickories
Carya sect. Sinocarya

Carya dabieshanensis M.C. Liu – Dabie Shan hickory (may be synonymous with C. cathayensis)
Carya cathayensis Sarg. – Chinese hickory
Carya hunanensis W.C.Cheng & R.H.Chang – Hunan hickory
Carya kweichowensis Kuang & A.M.Lu – Guizhou hickory
Carya poilanei Leroy – Poilane's hickory
Carya tonkinensis Lecomte – Vietnamese hickory

North American hickories
Carya sect. Carya – typical hickories

Carya floridana Sarg. – scrub hickory
Carya glabra (Mill.) Sweet – pignut hickory, pignut, sweet pignut, coast pignut hickory, smoothbark hickory, swamp hickory, broom hickory
Carya laciniosa (Mill.) K.Koch – shellbark hickory, shagbark hickory, bigleaf shagbark hickory, kingnut, big shellbark, bottom shellbark, thick shellbark, western shellbark
Carya myristiciformis (F.Michx.) Nutt. – nutmeg hickory, swamp hickory, bitter water hickory
Carya ovalis (Wangenh.) Sarg. – red hickory, spicebark hickory, sweet pignut hickory (treated as a synonym of C. glabra by Flora N. Amer.)
Carya ovata (Mill.) K.Koch – shagbark hickory
C. o. var. ovata – northern shagbark hickory
C. o. var. australis – southern shagbark hickory, Carolina hickory (syn. C. carolinae-septentrionalis)
Carya pallida (Ashe) Engl. & Graebn. – sand hickory
Carya texana Buckley – black hickory
Carya tomentosa (Poir.) Nutt. – mockernut hickory (syn. C. alba)
†Carya washingtonensis Manchester – Miocene of Kittitas County, Washington

Carya sect. Apocarya – pecans

Carya aquatica (F.Michx.) Nutt. – bitter pecan or water hickory
Carya cordiformis (Wangenh.) K.Koch – bitternut hickory
Carya illinoinensis (Wangenh.) K.Koch – pecan
Carya palmeri W.E. Manning – Mexican hickory

Ecology
Hickory is used as a food plant by the larvae of some Lepidoptera species. These include:
 Luna moth (Actias luna)
 Brown-tail moth (Euproctis chrysorrhoea)
 Coleophora case-bearers, C. laticornella and C. ostryae
 Regal moths (Citheronia regalis), whose caterpillars are known as hickory horn-devils
 Walnut sphinx (Amorpha juglandis)
 The bride (nominate subspecies Catocala neogama neogama)
 Hickory tussock moth (Lophocampa caryae)

The hickory leaf stem gall phylloxera (Phylloxera caryaecaulis) also uses the hickory tree as a food source. Phylloxeridae are related to aphids and have a similarly complex life cycle. Eggs hatch in early spring and the galls quickly form around the developing insects. Phylloxera galls may damage weakened or stressed hickories, but are generally harmless. Deformed leaves and twigs can rain down from the tree in the spring as squirrels break off infected tissue and eat the galls, possibly for the protein content or because the galls are fleshy and tasty to the squirrels. The pecan gall curculio (Conotrachelus elegans) is a true weevil species also found feeding on galls of the hickory leaf stem gall phylloxera.

The banded hickory borer (Knulliana cincta) is also found on hickories.

Evolutionary history
The oldest fossils attributed to Carya are Cretaceous pollen grains from Mexico and New Mexico. Fossil and molecular data suggest the genus Carya may have diversified during the Miocene. Modern Carya first appear in Oligocene strata 34 million years ago. Recent discoveries of Carya fruit fossils further support the hypothesis that the genus has long been a member of Eastern North American landscapes, however its range has contracted and Carya is no longer extant west of the Rocky Mountains.

Fossils of early hickory nuts show simpler, thinner shells than modern species with the exception of pecans, suggesting that the trees gradually developed defenses to rodent seed predation. During this time, the genus had a distribution across the Northern Hemisphere, but the Pleistocene Ice Age beginning 2 million years ago obliterated it from Europe. The distribution of Carya in North America also contracted and it completely disappeared from the continent west of the Rocky Mountains. Since fossil records show North America as having the largest number of Juglandaceae species, it is likely that the genus originated there and later spread to Europe and Asia.

Fruit

Some fruits are borderline and difficult to categorize.  Hickory nuts (Carya) and walnuts (Juglans) in the Juglandaceae family grow within an outer husk; these fruits are sometimes considered to be drupes or drupaceous nuts, rather than true botanical nuts. "Tryma" is a specialized term for such nut-like drupes.

Nutrition
Dried hickory nuts are 3% water, 18% carbohydrates, 13% protein, and 64% fats (table). In a 100 gram (3.5 oz) reference amount, dried hickory nuts supply 657 calories, and are a rich source (20% or more of the Daily Value, DV) of several B vitamins and dietary minerals, especially manganese at 220% DV (table).

Uses

Hickory wood is hard, stiff, dense and shock resistant. There are woods stronger than hickory and woods that are harder, but the combination of strength, toughness, hardness, and stiffness found in hickory wood is not found in any other commercial wood.  It is used for tool handles, pickaxe handles, bows, wheel spokes, carts, drumsticks, lacrosse stick handles, golf club shafts (sometimes still called hickory stick, even though made of steel or graphite), the bottoms of skis, walking sticks, and for punitive use as a switch (like hazel), and especially as a cane-like hickory stick in schools and use by parents. Paddles are often made from hickory. This property of hickory wood has left a trace in some Native American languages: in Ojibwe, hickory is called mitigwaabaak, a compound of mitigwaab "bow" and the final -aakw "hardwood tree". Due to its grain structure, hickory is more susceptible to moisture absorption than other species of wood, and is therefore more prone to shrinkage, warping or swelling with changes in humidity.

Baseball bats were formerly made of hickory, but are now more commonly made of ash. Hickory is replacing ash as the wood of choice for Scottish shinty sticks (also known as camans). Hickory was extensively used for the construction of early aircraft.

Hickory is also highly prized for wood-burning stoves and chimineas, as its density and high energy content make it an efficient fuel. Hickory wood is also a preferred type for smoking cured meats. In the Southern United States, hickory is popular for cooking barbecue, as hickory grows abundantly in the region and adds flavor to the meat.

Hickory is sometimes used for wood flooring due to its durability in resisting wear and character.  Hickory wood is not noted for rot resistance.

A extract from shagbark hickory bark is also used in an edible syrup similar to maple syrup, with a slightly bitter, smoky taste. The Cherokee people would produce a green dye from hickory bark, which they used to dye cloth. When this bark was mixed with maple bark, it produced a yellow dye pigment. The ashes of burnt hickory wood were traditionally used to produce a strong lye (potash) fit for soapmaking.

The nuts of some species are palatable and were used by Cherokee Indians in making Kanuchi soup, while others are bitter and only suitable for animal feed. Shagbark and shellbark hickory, along with pecan, are regarded by some as the finest nut trees. Pecans are the most important nut tree native to North America.

When cultivated for their nuts, clonal (grafted) trees of the same cultivar cannot pollinate each other because of their self-incompatibility. Two or more cultivars must be planted together for successful pollination. Seedlings (grown from hickory nuts) will usually have sufficient genetic variation.

Gallery

See also
 Hican
 Walnut

References

Philips, Roger. Trees of North America and Europe. Random House, Inc., New York. , 1979.

External links

 Carya images at the Arnold Arboretum of Harvard University Plant Image Database
 Damery, Jonathan. "The Carya Collection." Arnold Arboretum of Harvard University website. Accessed 26 May 2020.

Edible nuts and seeds
Extant Oligocene first appearances
Native American cuisine of the Southeastern Woodlands
Plant dyes
Plants used in Native American cuisine
Wood